The 2022–23 NC State Wolfpack men's basketball team represented North Carolina State University during the 2022–23 NCAA Division I men's basketball season. The Wolfpack were led by sixth-year head coach Kevin Keatts and played their home games at PNC Arena in Raleigh, North Carolina as members of the Atlantic Coast Conference (ACC).

Previous season
The Wolfpack finished the 2021–22 season 11–21, 4–16 in ACC play to finish in 15th place. In the ACC tournament, they lost to Clemson in the first round.

Offseason

Departures

Incoming transfers

2022 recruiting class

Roster

Schedule and results

|-
!colspan=12 style=| Exhibition

|-
!colspan=12 style=| Regular season

|-
!colspan=12 style=| ACC tournament

|-
!colspan=12 style=""| NCAA tournament

Source

Rankings

*AP does not release post-NCAA tournament rankings^Coaches did not release a Week 2 poll.

References

NC State Wolfpack men's basketball seasons
NC State
NC State Wolfpack men's basketball
NC State Wolfpack men's basketball
NC State